The 1948 Sugar Bowl featured the fifth ranked Texas Longhorns and the sixth ranked Alabama Crimson Tide.

In the first quarter, Texas scored on a 99-yard touchdown pass form Bobby Layne to Blount, as Texas opened a 7-0 lead. In the second quarter, Alabama tied the game on an 8-yard touchdown pass from Gilmer to White. In the third quarter, Texas's Vic Vasicek recovered a fumble in the end zone as Texas took a 14-7 lead. Holder later returned an interception 18 yards for a touchdown making it 21-7. Bobby Layne scored on a 1-yard touchdown run making the final score 27-7.

Bobby Layne was named Sugar Bowl MVP.

References

Sugar Bowl
Sugar Bowl
Alabama Crimson Tide football bowl games
Texas Longhorns football bowl games
Sugar Bowl
Sugar Bowl